Willem Twee Poppodium is a pop venue in the Dutch city 's-Hertogenbosch. The venue got its current name in 2017. It was formerly known as W2 poppodium (pop venue) and Willem II Concertzaal (concert venue).

Willem Twee Poppodium is situated in a former cigar factory Willem II.
Since 2017 they acquired an old synagogue to incorporate it as a classical and jazz venue called Willem Twee Toonzaal. It is located in the Prins Bernhardstraat in 's-Hertogenbosch.
The organisation also consists of music studio's, exposition rooms, conference rooms, rehearsal rooms and a café.

References

External links
Willem Twee (official website)

Music venues in the Netherlands
Music in North Brabant
Buildings and structures in 's-Hertogenbosch
's-Hertogenbosch